Patcharapa Chaichua (born 5 December 1978), or nickname Aum, is a Thai actress.

Biography 
Patcharapa was born on 5 December 1978 in Bangkok, Thailand. Her birth name is "Khaimuk Chaichua", which later changed to "Patcharapa Chaichua". She entered the entertainment industry in 1997 after she won a beauty and talent contest called HACKS. 
The TV series that put Aum Patchrapa in the spotlight was Song Sanae Ha in 2003. She played the lead role of Pralee. Aum won the 2003 TOP Award for Best Leading Actress. That year, Chaichua starred in Fake for her first movie.

She won her second TOP Award in 2005 for Pleung Payu which also starred Tana Suttikamol. Since then she has been the highest-paid actress in Thailand. Aum Patchrapa once again was nominated for the Top Awards in 2006, as Best Leading Actress for the lakorns Pin mook and Song Sanae, but the award went to Ann Thongprasom for the lakorn Oum ruk. Besides her talent in acting, Aum Patchrapa was voted FHM (Thai edition's) sexiest woman for three consecutive years (2004 to 2006) but in 2007 she was beaten by May Pichanart.

Filmography

Tv Series 
All have been broadcast on BBTV 7

Movie

Host

Awards and nominations

Nataraja Awards

TV Gold Awards

Top Awards

References

External links
 Facebook : 

Living people
1978 births
Patcharapa Chaichua
Patcharapa Chaichua
Patcharapa Chaichua
Patcharapa Chaichua
Patcharapa Chaichua